The Haller Case (Italian: Il caso Haller) is a 1933 Italian thriller film directed by Alessandro Blasetti and starring Marta Abba, Memo Benassi and Camillo Pilotto. The film is based on the 1893 play Der Andere by Paul Lindau. It marked the screen debut of Isa Miranda, who had her breakthrough role the following year in Everybody's Woman and emerged as the most international-renowned Italian actress of the decade.

It was shot at the Cines Studios in Rome. The film's sets were designed by the art directors Arnaldo Foresti and Alfredo Montori.

Cast
 Marta Abba as La Rossa 
 Memo Benassi as Judge Haller 
 Camillo Pilotto as Gang's leader 
 Vittorio Vaser as Gang member 
 Isa Miranda as Badwoman
 Cele Abba 
 Ugo Ceseri
 Vasco Creti 
 Natalia Murray Danesi 
 Egisto Olivieri 
 Umberto Sacripante

Other film versions
 The Other (January 1913, Germany, directed by Max Mack)
 The Other (August 1930, Germany, directed by Robert Wiene)
 The Prosecutor Hallers (November 1930, France, directed by Robert Wiene)

References

Bibliography 
 Brizio-Skov, Flavia. Popular Italian Cinema: Culture and Politics in a Postwar Society. I.B.Tauris, 2011.

External links 
 

1933 films
Italian thriller films
Italian black-and-white films
1930s thriller films
1930s Italian-language films
Films directed by Alessandro Blasetti
Italian films based on plays
Italian remakes of foreign films
Remakes of German films
Cines Studios films
1930s Italian films